Mecatepe Lagoon Natural Reserve is a nature reserve in Nicaragua. It is one of the 78 reserves that are under official protection in the country. It is located in southern Granada Department, east of hwy 1.

References

 

Protected areas of Nicaragua